The 68th Hong Kong–Macau Interport was an association football match held in Macau on 16 June 2012. Macau were the defending champions as they captured the champion by winning 1-0 the previous year.

Squads

Hong Kong

Hong Kong was represented by its under-22 national team.

 Head Coach:  Ernie Merrick
 Coaches: Poon Man Tik, Szeto Man Chun, Fan Chun Yip
 Technical Director: Steve O'Connor

Note: Leung Kwun Chung was original selected in the main squad. However, he resigned due to injury. Wong Yim Kwan and Lo Kong Wai were then selected to the squad.

Macau

 Chief Manager: Victor Cheung Lup Kwan
 Manager: Chong Coc Veng, Sin Chi Yiu, Chang Chin Nam
 Head Coach:  Leung Sui Wing
 Coaches: Ku Chan Kuong, Iong Cho Ieng, Chu Hon Ming
 Physio: Lao Chi Leong

Results

References

Hong Kong–Macau Interport
Macau
Hong